Yarde Halt railway station was an intermediate halt on the initially privately run North Devon and Cornwall Junction Light Railway, opened in 1926 to serve  clay works along its route. It was closed to passengers in 1965 and now forms part of the popular Tarka trail, a route for ramblers promoted by the local council.

See also 

List of closed railway stations in Britain

References

External links
List of former West Country Halts

Disused railway stations in Devon
Former Southern Railway (UK) stations
Railway stations in Great Britain opened in 1926
Railway stations in Great Britain closed in 1965
1925 establishments in England
1965 disestablishments in England
Beeching closures in England
Torridge District